Memoirs of a Police Sergeant is a satirical novel written by the Brazilian author Manuel Antônio de Almeida. It was first published in 1852. 

The book is full of picturesque descriptions of Rio de Janeiro's life in the early 19th century, including popular feasts and holidays. The book is considered to be an outstanding work in the Brazilian Literature, because of its almost grotesque humor against some Brazilian institutions, like the Army, the Church and is considered, besides a literary masterpiece, an important source of Brazilian history.

Plot 
The novel is set at around 1808 (since the first line line is something like "It was in the Time of the King") and it tells the colourful story of a problem child (Leonardo), from when his parents first meet, until his childhood, in a hypocritical and corrupt society. Leonardo grows up into an amoral, reckless young man until he is arrested by the police and given the chance of becoming a police officer instead of serving his sentence.

Editions 

External links 
 Memórias de um Sargento de Milícias available at MetaLibri Digital Library 

1852 Brazilian novels
Satirical novels
Novels set in Rio de Janeiro (city)